Leon Reid (born 26 July 1994) is a male track and field sprinter who competes for Ireland, and Northern Ireland at the Commonwealth Games. He came third in the 200 metres event at the 2018 Commonwealth Games

Career
Born in the West Country, England, Reid won silver medals for Great Britain at the European Youth Summer Olympic Festival, 2013 European Athletics Junior Championships and 2015 European Athletics U23 Championships. He also won a relay silver medal for England at the 2008 Commonwealth Youth Games. He later decided to represent Northern Ireland – the nation of his mother's birth – and made his international debut for them at the 2014 Commonwealth Games. He attempted to transfer his allegiance to represent Ireland, but this move was blocked following a temporary freeze on such moves by the International Association of Athletics Federations. Once the freeze was lifted, Reid began competing for Ireland, with his first event the 2018 European Championships.

Reid took bronze in the men's 200 metres at the 2018 Commonwealth Games.  Initially he finished 4th, but was elevated when Zharnel Hughes was disqualified for a lane violation.  This was the first Commonwealth Games athletics medal for Northern Ireland in 28 years.

Reid won the 200 metres at the Irish National Championships in June 2021, and was nominated to the 2020 Summer Olympics team. Initially, the Olympic Federation of Ireland rejected Reid's selection to the team, due to his pending trial for conspiracy to supply cocaine, but he was included in the team after filing an appeal. The delayed Olympics took place in August 2021, and Reid qualified for the 200 metres semi-finals by finishing fifth in his heat, with a season's best time of 20.53 seconds. He failed to qualify for the final after finishing seventh in his semi-final. Reid was selected for the Northern Irish team at the 2022 Commonwealth Games, but on 12 July 2022, he was barred from participating on security grounds.

Personal life
Reid was born in Bath to an English-Jamaican father, and a mother from Belfast, Northern Ireland. He was adopted by a woman whose parents were from the Republic of Ireland. Reid has self-identified as both Northern Irish and Irish.

In April 2021, Reid was charged with conspiracy to supply cocaine by Bristol Crown Court. In February 2022, he was given a 22-month suspended sentence, and ordered to do 220 hours of unpaid work.

International competitions

See also
List of Commonwealth Games medallists in athletics (men)

References

External links
 
 
 
 
 

1994 births
Living people
Sportspeople from Bath, Somerset
Irish male sprinters
English male sprinters
Male sprinters from Northern Ireland
Irish people of Jamaican descent
Sportspeople of Jamaican descent
Irish people of English descent
People from Northern Ireland of Jamaican descent
British sportspeople of Jamaican descent
People from Northern Ireland of English descent
English sportspeople of Jamaican descent
English people of Northern Ireland descent
Commonwealth Games bronze medallists for Northern Ireland
Commonwealth Games medallists in athletics
Athletes (track and field) at the 2018 Commonwealth Games
Athletes (track and field) at the 2020 Summer Olympics
Olympic athletes of Ireland
Medallists at the 2018 Commonwealth Games